= House of Tsysarenko =

- Дом Цысаренко (Russian)
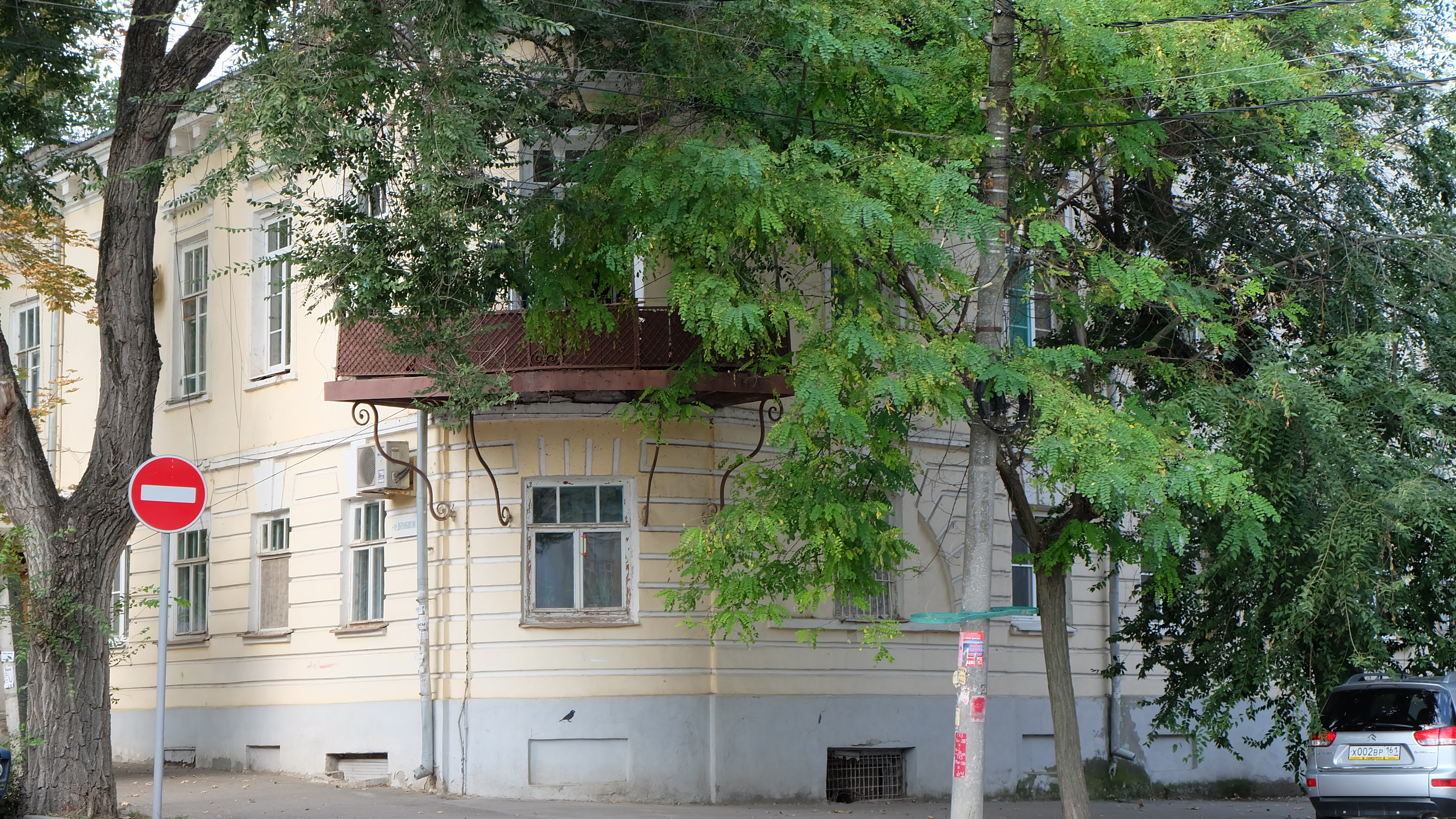
- Interactive map of the House of Tsysarenko area

General information
- Location: Taganrog, Grecheskaya Street, 55
- Coordinates: 47°12′37″N 38°56′22″E

The House of Tsysarenko (Russian: Дом Цысаренко) is an object of cultural heritage of regional value constructed at the beginning of the 19th century down the street Greek, 55 in the city of Taganrog of the Rostov Oblast. The house has historical value as the place which was visited by the writer Anton Pavlovich Chekhov.

== History ==
Tikhon Tsysarenko elected in 1786 was the first civil mayor of Taganrog. He built the house down the street Greek, 55 in 1810. Pavel Tikhonovich came from merchant family of honorary citizens of the city. In 1826 the city construction committee redeemed the house from Pavel Tikhonovich Tsysarenko in order that there the archive, orphan court and the house of the city's mayor was placed.

Initially, the repayment of the house of Tsysarenko was necessary because of the city there arrived the imperial family. The Empress Elizabeth Alekseevna got the house in which she stopped with the husband from the city. And the cost of the house of Tsysarenko was estimated at 49 thousand rubles. The persons holding a position of the city's mayor began to live in it. From 1844 to 1854 in this house there lived the major general Alexander Karlovic Liven.

From 1873 to 1907 in this household there was a Town Council and City bank. In 1874 on the first floor of the house Vashchinenko's library opened. On May 23, 1976, in one of the rooms of a justice opening public city library which during training in a gymnasium was visited by the writer Anton Pavlovich Chekhov and the historian Pavel Petrovich Filevsky took place. In April 1877 the library moved to Dashkevich's house.

From 1907 to 1909 in the building there was a public bank. On September 14, 1903, the part of the house was transferred to a private gymnasium of madam Yanovich, her opening took place on September 14, 1906. Training in 7 main classes, 2 preparatory classes was organized. The hostel worked. The payment for a year of training made 300 rubles. An education in a gymnasium Yanovich was got by about 100 girls, among them there is a daughter of the managing director of the Azov and Don bank Natalya Lutskaya, the daughter of the land owner Kovalyov's Muse, Tolstoy's relative — Anna Tolstaya and many others.

Since 1992 the house is protected by the law as an object of cultural heritage.

== Description ==
The two-storeyed stone house on a high socle is built in the style of early classicism. The balcony is located on the rounded house corner. On the first floor, there is a window, on the second a door with an exit to a balcony. The sole of the house is decorated by semi-windows, and a facade — panels, the pro-thinned-out platbands, and sundeck. On the first floor, there are 2 extreme windows of an arch form, 7 windows with castle fan stones without platbands and 4 windows on side of the lane with capstones. Three windows in the middle of the second floor — semi-circular. They were at the level of a solemn assembly hall. Window designs on the second floor are limited to a parapet which leans on rectangular pilasters. At extreme windows is triangular сандрик with arms. Windows were constructed with an internal sun blind. The crowning eaves are decorated with cloves.

In 1889 for improvement of the appearance of the house, on the project of the architect S. Gushchin on the central part of the building, there was the poorly acting projection which crowned a triangular pediment.

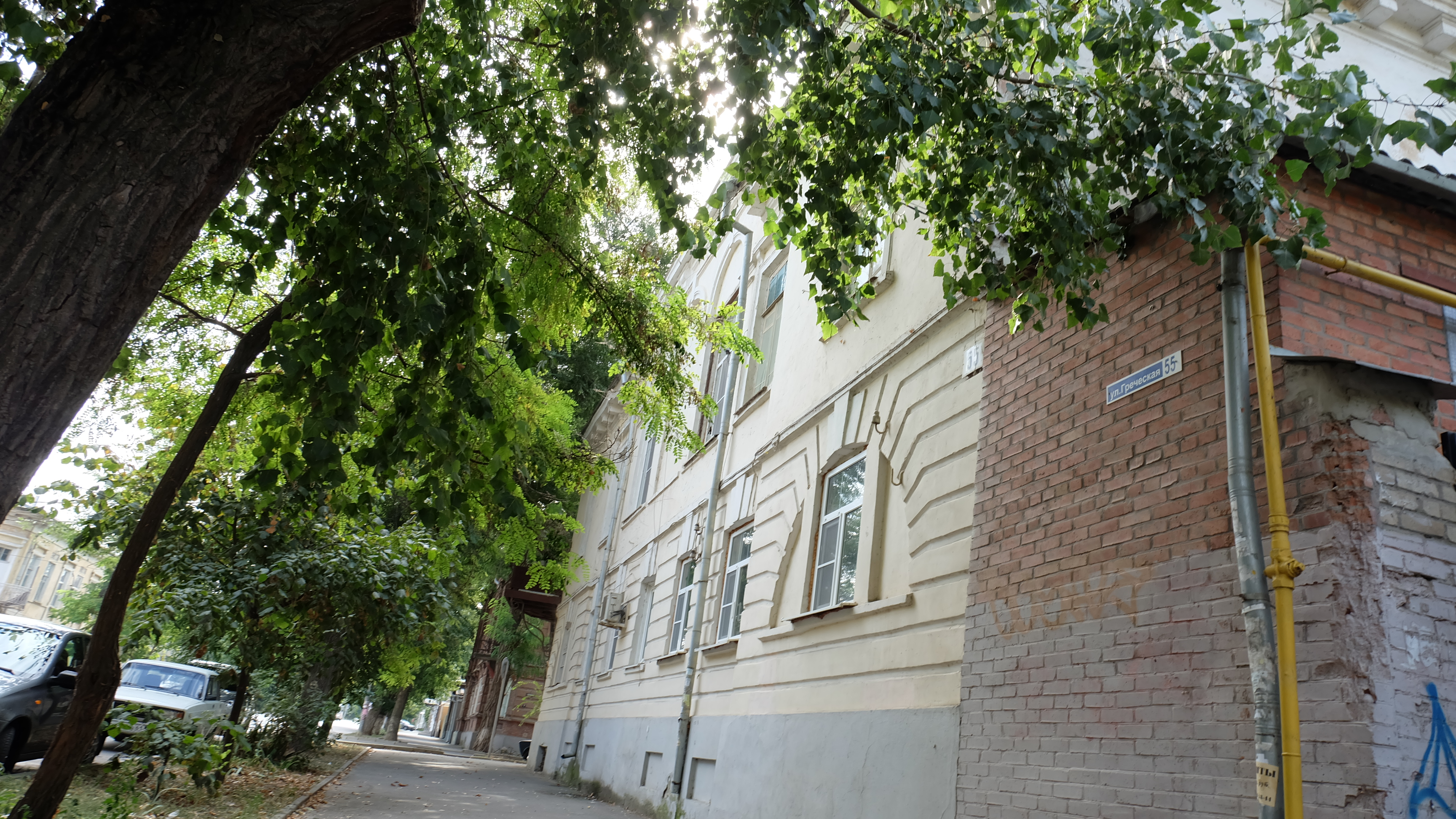
